ES La Ciotat are a football club based in the town of La Ciotat in France.

History
The club were originally formed in 1921

Stadium
The club currently play in the Stade Jean Bouissou stadium, Boulevard de Clavel, 13600 La Ciotat.  The stadium has a capacity of 2200

Achievements
Champion de Provence de DHR 1994-95

Notable former players
1. Players that have played/Managed in the French league or any foreign equivalent to this level (i.e. fully professional league).
2. Players with full international caps.
3. Players that hold a club record or have captained the club.

Lucien Cossou
John Maessner
Curt Onalfo
Baptiste Aloé

References

External links
 Official website

Association football clubs established in 1921
1921 establishments in France
Sport in Bouches-du-Rhône
Football clubs in Provence-Alpes-Côte d'Azur